The 1924 United States rugby union tour of England and France was a series of five matches played by the United States in England and France during April and May 1924. The matches in England were warm-up matches for the 1924 Olympic Games. The United States was the defending Olympic champions and successfully defended their title despite fielding a team made up mainly of sportsmen from other sports. In the intervening years, between the 1920 and 1924 Olympic Games, France had played twenty-one internationals and the United States none.

Touring party

Full backs
 Charles Doe (Stanford University)

Three-quarters
 Norman Cleaveland (Stanford University)
 George Dixon (University of California)
 Richard Hyland (Stanford University)
 William Rogers (Stanford University)
 Edward Turkington (Lowell High School) (Olympic Club)

Half-backs
 Robert Devereux (Stanford University)
 Rudy Scholz (Santa Clara University)

Forwards
 Philip Clark (Stanford University)
 Linn Farrish (Stanford University)
 Dudley DeGroot (Stanford University)
 Edward Graff (University of California)
 Caesar Mannelli (Santa Clara University)
 John O'Neill (Santa Clara University)
 John Patick (Stanford University)
 Colby Slater (University of California), (Davis Farm), (Olympic Club)
 Norman Slater (Berkeley High School)
 Alan Valentine (Swarthmore College), (Oxford University)

Undisclosed position
 John Cashel (Palo Alto)
 Hugh Cunningham (Santa Clara University)
 Joseph Hunter (San Mateo High), (Beliston)
 William Muldoon (Santa Clara University)
 Alan Williams (Cornell University), (Olympic Club)

Fixtures

Tour of England

1924 Olympic Tournament

References

1924 rugby union tours
1923–24 in English rugby union
1923–24 in French rugby union
1924 in American sports
1924
1924
1924